Charles Lamb (10 February 1775 – 27 December 1834) was an English essayist, poet, and antiquarian, best known for his Essays of Elia and for the children's book Tales from Shakespeare, co-authored with his sister, Mary Lamb (1764–1847).

Friends with such literary luminaries as Samuel Taylor Coleridge, Robert Southey, William Wordsworth, and William Hazlitt, Lamb was at the centre of a major literary circle in England. He has been referred to by E. V. Lucas, his principal biographer, as "the most lovable figure in English literature".

Youth and schooling

Lamb was born in London, the son of John Lamb (–1799) and Elizabeth (died 1796), née Field. Lamb had an elder brother and sister; four other siblings did not survive infancy. John Lamb was a lawyer's clerk and spent most of his professional life as the assistant to a barrister named Samuel Salt, who lived in the Inner Temple in the legal district of London; it was there, in Crown Office Row, that Charles Lamb was born and spent his youth. Lamb created a portrait of his father in his "Elia on the Old Benchers" under the name Lovel. Lamb's older brother was too much his senior to be a youthful companion to the boy but his sister Mary, being born eleven years before him, was probably his closest playmate. Lamb was also cared for by his paternal aunt Hetty, who seems to have had a particular fondness for him. A number of writings by both Charles and Mary suggest that the conflict between Aunt Hetty and her sister-in-law created a certain degree of tension in the Lamb household. However, Charles speaks fondly of her and her presence in the house seems to have brought a great deal of comfort to him.

Some of Lamb's fondest childhood memories were of time spent with Mrs Field, his maternal grandmother, who was for many years a servant to the Plumer family, who owned a large country house called Blakesware, near Widford, Hertfordshire. After the death of Mrs Plumer, Lamb's grandmother was in sole charge of the large home and, as William Plumer was often absent, Charles had free rein of the place during his visits. A picture of these visits can be glimpsed in the Elia essay Blakesmoor in H—shire.

Little is known about Charles's life before he was seven other than that Mary taught him to read at a very early age and he read voraciously. It is believed that he had smallpox during his early years, which forced him into a long period of convalescence. After this period of recovery Lamb began to take lessons from Mrs Reynolds, a woman who lived in the Temple and is believed to have been the former wife of a lawyer. Mrs Reynolds must have been a sympathetic schoolmistress because Lamb maintained a relationship with her throughout his life and she is known to have attended dinner parties held by Mary and Charles in the 1820s. E. V. Lucas suggests that sometime in 1781 Charles left Mrs Reynolds and began to study at the Academy of William Bird.

His time with William Bird did not last long, however, because by October 1782 Lamb was enrolled in Christ's Hospital, a charity boarding school chartered by King Edward VI in 1553. A thorough record of Christ's Hospital is to be found in several essays by Lamb as well as The Autobiography of Leigh Hunt and the Biographia Literaria of Samuel Taylor Coleridge, with whom Charles developed a friendship that would last for their entire lives. Despite the school's brutality, Lamb got along well there, due in part, perhaps, to the fact that his home was not far distant, thus enabling him, unlike many other boys, to return often to its safety. Years later, in his essay "Christ's Hospital Five and Thirty Years Ago", Lamb described these events, speaking of himself in the third person as "L".

Christ's Hospital was a typical English boarding school and many students later wrote of the terrible violence they suffered there. The upper master (i.e. principal or headteacher) of the school from 1778 to 1799 was Reverend James Boyer, a man renowned for his unpredictable and capricious temper. In one famous story Boyer was said to have knocked one of Leigh Hunt's teeth out by throwing a copy of Homer at him from across the room. Lamb seemed to have escaped much of this brutality, in part because of his amiable personality and in part because Samuel Salt, his father's employer and Lamb's sponsor at the school, was one of the institute's governors.

Charles Lamb had a stutter and this "inconquerable impediment" in his speech deprived him of Grecian status at Christ's Hospital, thus disqualifying him for a clerical career. While Coleridge and other scholarly boys were able to go on to Cambridge, Lamb left school at fourteen and was forced to find a more prosaic career. For a short time he worked in the office of Joseph Paice, a London merchant, and then, for 23 weeks, until 8 February 1792, held a small post in the Examiner's Office of the South Sea House. Its subsequent downfall in a pyramid scheme after Lamb left would be contrasted to the company's prosperity in the first Elia essay. On 5 April 1792 he went to work in the Accountant's Office for the British East India Company, the death of his father's employer having ruined the family's fortunes. Charles would continue to work there for 25 years, until his retirement with pension (the "superannuation" he refers to in the title of one essay).

In 1792 while tending to his grandmother, Mary Field, in Hertfordshire, Charles Lamb fell in love with a young woman named Ann Simmons. Although no epistolary record exists of the relationship between the two, Lamb seems to have spent years wooing her. The record of the love exists in several accounts of Lamb's writing. "Rosamund Gray" is a story of a young man named Allen Clare who loves Rosamund Gray but their relationship comes to nothing because of her sudden death. Miss Simmons also appears in several Elia essays under the name "Alice M". The essays "Dream Children", "New Year's Eve", and several others, speak of the many years that Lamb spent pursuing his love that ultimately failed. Miss Simmons eventually went on to marry a silversmith and Lamb called the failure of the affair his "great disappointment".

Family tragedy
Both Charles and his sister Mary had a period of mental illness. As he himself confessed in a letter, Charles spent six weeks in a mental facility during 1795:

Mary Lamb's illness was more severe than her brother's, and it led her to become aggressive on a fatal occasion. On 22 September 1796, while preparing dinner, Mary became angry with her apprentice, roughly shoving the little girl out of her way and pushing her into another room. Her mother, Elizabeth, began admonishing her for this, and Mary had a mental breakdown. She took the kitchen knife she had been holding, unsheathed it, and approached her mother, who was sitting down. Mary, "worn down to a state of extreme nervous misery by attention to needlework by day and to her mother at night", was seized with acute mania and stabbed her mother in the heart with a table knife. Charles ran into the house soon after the murder and took the knife out of Mary's hand.

Later in the evening, Charles found a local place for Mary in a private mental facility called Fisher House, which had been found with the help of a doctor friend of his. While reports were published by the media, Charles wrote a letter to Samuel Taylor Coleridge in connection to the matricide:

Charles took over responsibility for Mary after refusing his brother John's suggestion that they have her committed to a public lunatic asylum. Lamb used a large part of his relatively meagre income to keep his beloved sister in the private "madhouse" in Islington. With the help of friends, Lamb succeeded in obtaining his sister's release from what would otherwise have been lifelong imprisonment. Although there was no legal status of "insanity" at the time, the jury returned the verdict of "lunacy" which was how she was freed from guilt of willful murder, on the condition that Charles take personal responsibility for her safekeeping.

The 1799 death of John Lamb was something of a relief to Charles because his father had been mentally incapacitated for a number of years since having a stroke. The death of his father also meant that Mary could come to live again with him in Pentonville, and in 1800 they set up a shared home at Mitre Court Buildings in the Temple, where they would live until 1809.

In 1800, Mary's illness came back and Charles had to take her back again to the asylum. In those days, Charles sent a letter to Coleridge, in which he admitted he felt melancholic and lonely, adding "I almost wish that Mary were dead."

Later she would come back, and both he and his sister would enjoy an active and rich social life. Their London quarters became a kind of weekly salon for many of the most outstanding theatrical and literary figures of the day. In 1869, a club, The Lambs, was formed in London to carry on their salon tradition. The actor Henry James Montague founded the club's New York counterpart in 1874.

Charles Lamb, having been to school with Samuel Coleridge, counted Coleridge as perhaps his closest, and certainly his oldest, friend. On his deathbed, Coleridge had a mourning ring sent to Lamb and his sister. Fortuitously, Lamb's first publication was in 1796, when four sonnets by "Mr Charles Lamb of the India House" appeared in Coleridge's Poems on Various Subjects. In 1797 he contributed additional blank verse to the second edition, and met the Wordsworths, William and Dorothy, on his short summer holiday with Coleridge at Nether Stowey, thereby also striking up a lifelong friendship with William. In London, Lamb became familiar with a group of young writers who favoured political reform, including Percy Bysshe Shelley, William Hazlitt, Leigh Hunt and William Hone.

Lamb continued to clerk for the East India Company and doubled as a writer in various genres, his tragedy, John Woodvil, being published in 1802. His farce, Mr H, was performed at Drury Lane in 1807, where it was roundly booed. In the same year, Tales from Shakespeare (Charles handled the tragedies; his sister Mary, the comedies) was published, and became a best seller for William Godwin's "Children's Library".

On 20 July 1819, at age 44, Lamb, who, because of family commitments, had never married, fell in love with an actress, Fanny Kelly, of Covent Garden, and besides writing her a sonnet he also proposed marriage. She refused him, and he died a bachelor.

His collected essays, under the title Essays of Elia, were published in 1823 ("Elia" being the pen name Lamb used as a contributor to The London Magazine).

The Essays of Elia would be criticised in the Quarterly Review (January 1823) by Robert Southey, who thought its author to be irreligious. When Charles read the review, entitled "The Progress of Infidelity", he was filled with indignation, and wrote a letter to his friend Bernard Barton, where Lamb declared he hated the review, and emphasised that his words "meant no harm to religion". First, Lamb did not want to retort, since he actually admired Southey; but later he felt the need to write a letter "Elia to Southey", in which he complained and expressed that the fact that he was a dissenter of the Church, did not make him an irreligious man. The letter would be published in The London Magazine, in October 1823:

A further collection called The Last Essays of Elia was published in 1833, shortly before Lamb's death. Also, in 1834, Samuel Coleridge died. The funeral was confined only to the family of the writer, so Lamb was prevented from attending and only wrote a letter to Rev. James Gilman, a very close [word missing], expressing his condolences.

On 27 December 1834, Lamb died of a streptococcal infection, erysipelas, contracted from a minor graze on his face sustained after slipping in the street; he was 59. From 1833 until their deaths, Charles and Mary lived at Bay Cottage, Church Street, Edmonton, north of London (now part of the London Borough of Enfield). Lamb is buried in All Saints' Churchyard, Edmonton. His sister, who was ten years his senior, survived him by more than a dozen years. She is buried beside him.

Work
Lamb's first publication was the inclusion of four sonnets in Coleridge's Poems on Various Subjects, published in 1796 by Joseph Cottle. The sonnets were significantly influenced by the poems of Burns and the sonnets of William Bowles, a largely forgotten poet of the late 18th century. Lamb's poems garnered little attention and are seldom read today. As he himself came to realise, he was a much more talented prose stylist than poet. Indeed, one of the most celebrated poets of the day—William Wordsworth—wrote to John Scott as early as 1815 that Lamb "writes prose exquisitely"—and this was five years before Lamb began The Essays of Elia for which he is now most famous.

Notwithstanding, Lamb's contributions to Coleridge's second edition of the Poems on Various Subjects showed significant growth as a poet. These poems included The Tomb of Douglas and A Vision of Repentance. Because of a temporary falling out with Coleridge, Lamb's poems were to be excluded in the third edition of the Poems though as it turned out a third edition never emerged. Instead, Coleridge's next publication was the monumentally influential Lyrical Ballads co-published with Wordsworth. Lamb, on the other hand, published a book entitled Blank Verse with Charles Lloyd, the mentally unstable son of the founder of Lloyds Bank. Lamb's most famous poem was written at this time and entitled The Old Familiar Faces. Like most of Lamb's poems, it is unabashedly sentimental, and perhaps for this reason it is still remembered and widely read today, being often included in anthologies of British and Romantic period poetry. Of particular interest to Lambarians is the opening verse of the original version of The Old Familiar Faces, which is concerned with Lamb's mother, whom Mary Lamb killed. It was a verse that Lamb chose to remove from the edition of his Collected Work published in 1818:

In the final years of the 18th century, Lamb began to work on prose, first in a novella entitled Rosamund Gray, which tells the story of a young girl whose character is thought to be based on Ann Simmons, an early love interest. Although the story is not particularly successful as a narrative because of Lamb's poor sense of plot, it was well thought of by Lamb's contemporaries and led Shelley to observe, "what a lovely thing is Rosamund Gray! How much knowledge of the sweetest part of our nature in it!" (Quoted in Barnett, page 50)

In the first years of the 19th century, Lamb began a fruitful literary cooperation with his sister Mary. Together they wrote at least three books for William Godwin's Juvenile Library. The most successful of these was Tales From Shakespeare, which ran through two editions for Godwin and has been published dozens of times in countless editions ever since. The book contains artful prose summaries of some of Shakespeare's most well-loved works. According to Lamb, he worked primarily on Shakespeare's tragedies, while Mary focused mainly on the comedies.

Lamb's essay "On the Tragedies of Shakespeare Considered with Reference to their Fitness for Stage Representation", which was originally published in the Reflector in 1811 with the title "On Garrick, and Acting; and the Plays of Shakspeare, considered with reference to their fitness for Stage Representation", has often been taken as the ultimate Romantic dismissal of the theatre. In the essay, Lamb argues that Shakespeare should be read, rather than performed, in order to protect Shakespeare from butchering by mass commercial performances. While the essay certainly criticises contemporary stage practice, it also develops a more complex reflection on the possibility of representing Shakespearean dramas:

Besides contributing to Shakespeare's reception with his and his sister's book Tales From Shakespeare, Lamb also contributed to the recovery of acquaintance with Shakespeare's contemporaries. Accelerating the increasing interest of the time in the older writers, and building for himself a reputation as an antiquarian, in 1808 Lamb compiled a collection of extracts from the old dramatists, Specimens of the English Dramatic Poets Who Lived About the Time of Shakespeare. This also contained critical "characters" of the old writers, which added to the flow of significant literary criticism, primarily of Shakespeare and his contemporaries, from Lamb's pen. Immersion in seventeenth-century authors, such as Robert Burton and Sir Thomas Browne, also changed the way Lamb wrote, adding a distinct flavour to his writing style. 

Lamb's friend the essayist William Hazlitt thus characterised him: "Mr. Lamb ... does not march boldly along with the crowd .... He prefers bye-ways to highways. When the full tide of human life pours along to some festive show, to some pageant of a day, Elia would stand on one side to look over an old book-stall, or stroll down some deserted pathway in search of a pensive description over a tottering doorway, or some quaint device in architecture, illustrative of embryo art and ancient manners. Mr. Lamb has the very soul of an antiquarian ...."

Although he did not write his first Elia essay until 1820, Lamb's gradual perfection of the essay form for which he eventually became famous began as early as 1811 in a series of open letters to Leigh Hunt's Reflector. The most famous of these early essays is "The Londoner", in which Lamb famously derides the contemporary fascination with nature and the countryside. In another well-known Reflector essay of 1811, he deemed William Hogarth's images to be books, filled with "the teeming, fruitful, suggestive meaning of words. Other pictures we look at; his pictures we read." He would continue to fine-tune his craft, experimenting with different essayistic voices and personae, for the better part of the next quarter century.

Religious views
Christianity played an important role in Lamb's personal life: although he was not a churchman he "sought consolation in religion,"<ref>Biography: Charles Lamb 1775–1834, The Poetry Foundation: </ref> as shown in letters he wrote to Samuel Taylor Coleridge and Bernard Barton in which he describes the New Testament as his "best guide" for life and recalls how he used to read the Psalms for one or two hours without getting tired. Other writings also deal with his Christian beliefs.E.V. Lucas. The Works of Charles and Mary Lamb, Volume 2 Like his friend Coleridge, Lamb was sympathetic to Priestleyan Unitarianism and was a Dissenter, and he was described by Coleridge himself as one whose "faith in Jesus ha[d] been preserved" even after the family tragedy. Wordsworth also described him as a firm Christian in the poem "Written After the Death of Charles Lamb", Alfred Ainger, in his work Charles Lamb, writes that Lamb's religion had become "an habit".

Lamb's own poems "On The Lord's Prayer", "A Vision of Repentance", "The Young Catechist", "Composed at Midnight", "Suffer Little Children, and Forbid Them Not to Come Unto Me", "Written a Twelvemonth After the Events", "Charity", "Sonnet to a Friend" and "David" express his religious faith, while his poem "Living Without God in the World" has been called a "poetic attack" on unbelief, in which Lamb expresses his disgust at atheism, attributing it to pride.

Legacy

There has always been a small but enduring following for Lamb's works, as the long-running and still-active Charles Lamb Bulletin demonstrates. Because of his quirky, even bizarre, style, he has been more of a "cult favourite" than an author with mass popular or scholarly appeal. Anne Fadiman notes regretfully that Lamb is not widely read in modern times: "I do not understand why so few other readers are clamoring for his company... [He] is kept alive largely through the tenuous resuscitations of university English departments.".

Two of the houses at Christ's Hospital (Lamb A and Lamb B) are named in his honour. and he is also honoured by The Latymer School, a grammar school in Edmonton, a suburb of London where he lived for a time: it has six houses, one of which, Lamb, is named after him. A major academic prize awarded each year at Christ's Hospital School's speech day is "The Lamb Prize for Independent Study".

Sir Edward Elgar wrote an orchestral work, Dream Children, inspired by Lamb's essay of that title.

A quotation from Lamb, "Lawyers, I suppose, were children once",' serves as the epigraph to Harper Lee's novel To Kill a Mockingbird.

The Charles Lamb pub in Islington is named after him.

Henry James Montague, founder of The Lambs Club, named it after the salon of Charles and his sister Mary.

Charles Lamb plays an important role in the plot of Mary Ann Shaffer and Annie Barrows's novel, The Guernsey Literary and Potato Peel Pie Society.Selected worksBlank Verse, poems, 1798A Tale of Rosamund Gray, and Old Blind Margaret, 1798John Woodvil, verse drama, 1802Tales from Shakespeare, 1807The Adventures of Ulysses, 1808Specimens of English Dramatic Poets who Lived About the Time of Shakespeare, 1808On the Tragedies of Shakespeare, 1811Witches and Other Night Fears, 1821Essays of Elia, 1823The Pawnbroker's Daughter, 1825The Last Essays of Elia, 1833Eliana, 1867

Notes

Biographical referencesLife of Charles Lamb, by E.V. Lucas, G.P. Putman & Sons, London, 1905, revised editions 1907 and 1921.Charles Lamb and the Lloyds, edited by E.V. Lucas, Smith, Elder & Company, London, 1898.Charles Lamb and His Contemporaries, by Edmund Blunden, Cambridge University Press, 1933.Companion to Charles Lamb, by Claude Prance, Mansell Publishing, London, 1938.Charles Lamb; A Memoir, by Barry Cornwall aka Bryan Procter, Edward Moxon, London, 1866.Young Charles Lamb, by Winifred Courtney, New York University Press, 1982.A Portrait of Charles Lamb, by David Cecil, Constable, London, 1983.Charles Lamb, by George Barnett, Twayne Publishers, Boston, 1976.A Double Life: A Biography of Charles and Mary Lamb, by Sarah Burton, Viking, 1993.The Lambs: Their Lives, Their Friends, and Their Correspondence, by William Carew Hazlitt, C. Scribner's Sons, 1897.Dream-Child: A Life of Charles Lamb'' by Eric G. Wilson, Yale University Press, 2022.

External links

Charles Lamb Facebook page
Online catalog of Charles Lamb's personal library, online at LibraryThing
Charles Lamb at the National Portrait Gallery, London
The Lambs, Inc., History
 
 Charles Lamb Collection. General Collection, Beinecke Rare Book and Manuscript Library.
 The Charles Lamb Society Page for The Charles Lamb Society, including information on Charles and Mary Lamb

1775 births
1834 deaths
English children's writers
English essayists
People from the City of London
Romanticism
People educated at Christ's Hospital
English letter writers
Writers from London
Writers with disabilities
English Christians
People from Widford, Hertfordshire